Vidoški is the medieval city of Stolac, Bosnia and Herzegovina. The ancient city is located above the modern city.

Architecture in Bosnia and Herzegovina
Fortified settlements
Stolac
Castles in Bosnia and Herzegovina